KRI Klewang (625) (builder model number X3K) was a Klewang-class stealth trimaran fast attack craft launched by PT Lundin Industry Invest for the Indonesian Navy in 2012. She was destroyed by a fire on 28 September 2012 while undergoing fitting out.

Design
The vessel has a complement of 29 personnel, including a team of special forces.

Klewang was planned to be armed with four and up to eight C-705 anti-ship missiles in enclosed launchers and a Type 730 CIWS in stealthy turret. According to the builder, the vessel also able to be armed with Penguin or Exocet missiles and naval gun of up to 57 mm caliber without affecting the stability of the vessel. She also carried an 11 m high-speed rigid-hulled inflatable boat for the special forces team.

See also
RV Triton
Sea Shadow (IX-529)

References

Trimarans
Military trimarans
Missile boats of the Indonesian Navy